The Adapazarı Express officially listed as the Haydarpaşa-Adapazarı Regional was a regional rail service, that ran between Istanbul and Adapazarı. For the majority of its time in service, it was the second-busiest route of the Turkish State Railways, after the Adana-Mersin Regional. Trains served a heavily populated region on the north-east shores of the Sea of Marmara, and the Sakarya plain so service was frequent, with 12 trains daily in each direction in 2012. The Regional service also passed through these important districts of Istanbul: Kadıköy, Maltepe, Kartal, Pendik, Tuzla as well as Gebze, İzmit and Adapazarı. Because of the cities the trains service, it had earned the nickname Metropolitan Express. The train used to service Coşkunoğulları station until the TOE (Turkish Automotive Industry) factory was closed in 1991. It also serviced Acısu, Tepetarla and Kurtköy stations until 1998. Due to the construction of the Istanbul-Ankara high-speed railway, the Haydarpaşa-Adapazarı Regional was discontinued on 1 February 2012 in order to rehabilitate the existing railway line. On 5 January 2015 service between Arifiye and Pendik was reopened with new faster regional service known as the Ada Express.

Equipment
Trains were usually 6-8 cars long with a single electric locomotive for motive power. Towards the end of its run, trains were usually equipped mostly with the Regional Fleet and a few Intercity Fleet cars. On occasion, a train was double-headed for special purposes.

Before TCDD rehabilitated its old intercity and regional fleet, the electric locomotives which pulled trains were the E40000 or the E52500 series, and cars consisted of black and red regional cars that were built by TÜVASAŞ primarily for this service. Also during the 1990s, MT5600 were used for a brief period of time, but due to ridership these DRCs couldn't handle the capacity. In the late 2000s/early 2010s trains used refurbished regional and intercity cars that came into service in the 1970s, with the conductor car being either the first or last car. The E43000 were the only type of locomotives that pulled trains, as well as pulling express service on the line to Ankara and other cities. Also the route was the last stronghold for regional cars, as they were replaced with DMUs on other routes. Sometimes E14000 EMUs, used for commuter service in İstanbul and previously Ankara, were used for special holidays or weekend service when extra equipment was needed.

Pictures

References

External links
TCDD Official Site
Adapazarı Regional timetable - tcdd.gov.tr

Passenger rail transport in Turkey
Named passenger trains of Turkey
Train-related introductions in 1977